Kucheh may refer to the following places in Iran:

 Kucheh, Kermanshah
 Kucheh, Sistan and Baluchestan
 Kucheh, Chabahar (Kuchu), Sistan and Baluchestan Province